Rik de Voest and Adil Shamasdin won the final 6–3, 7–6(11–9) against Treat Conrad Huey and Izak van der Merwe.

Seeds

Draw

Draw

References
 Doubles Draw

Nottingham,Doubles
2011 Men's Doubles